Love Among the Millionaires is a 1930 American comedy film directed by Frank Tuttle and written by William M. Conselman, Grover Jones, Herman J. Mankiewicz and Keene Thompson. The film stars Clara Bow, Stanley Smith, Stuart Erwin, Richard "Skeets" Gallagher, Mitzi Green, Charles Sellon and Claude King. The film was released on July 19, 1930, by Paramount Pictures.

Cast 
Clara Bow as Pepper Whipple
Stanley Smith as Jerry Hamilton
Stuart Erwin as Clicker Watson
Richard "Skeets" Gallagher	as Boots McGee
Mitzi Green as Penelope 'Penny' Whipple
Charles Sellon as Pop Whipple
Claude King as Mr. Hamilton
Barbara Bennett as Virginia Hamilton
Theodore von Eltz as William Jordan

References

External links 
 

1930 films
1930s English-language films
Silent American comedy films
1930 comedy films
Paramount Pictures films
Films directed by Frank Tuttle
American black-and-white films
1930s American films